Isaac Wilson (June 25, 1780 Middlebury, then Vermont Republic, now Addison County, Vermont – October 25, 1848 Batavia, Kane County, Illinois) was an American politician from New York and Illinois.

Life
Wilson served in the War of 1812 as a captain of Cavalry. He moved to Batavia, New York. He was a member from Genesee County of the New York State Assembly in 1816–1817. He was a member of the New York State Senate (Western D.) from 1818 to 1821. He was First Judge of the Genesee County Court from 1821 to 1823.

Wilson was declared elected as a Democratic-Republican to the 18th United States Congress, holding office from March 4, 1823, to January 7, 1824, when he was succeeded by Parmenio Adams. Wilson took his seat when Congress met on December 1, 1823, but Adams contested Wilson's election, because the election inspectors had made mistakes when certifying the returns. 

Wilson was again First Judge of the Genesee County Court from 1830 to 1836. Afterwards he moved to Head of the Big Woods in Illinois. At Wilson's suggestion, the place was renamed Batavia, Illinois, after his former home.  He was appointed Postmaster of Batavia on February 6, 1841, and served until July 21, 1846, when his successor was appointed.

He was buried at the East Batavia Cemetery in Batavia, Illinois.

See also

1822 United States House of Representatives elections in New York

References

Sources

The New York Civil List compiled by Franklin Benjamin Hough (pages 71, 123f, 147, 192, 317, 360 and 448; Weed, Parsons and Co., 1858)
The New York Civil List compiled by Franklin Benjamin Hough, Stephen C. Hutchins and Edgar Albert Werner (1867; page 269)
Cases of Contested Elections in Congress 1789 to 1834 compiled by Matthew St. Clair Clarke and David A. Hall (Washington, D.C., 1834; Case XLIX, pages 369ff)
Place Names of Illinois by Edward Callary (page 25)

1780 births
1848 deaths
New York (state) state court judges
New York (state) state senators
Members of the New York State Assembly
People from Middlebury, Vermont
Illinois postmasters
People from Batavia, Illinois
Democratic-Republican Party members of the United States House of Representatives from New York (state)
19th-century American politicians
19th-century American judges
Members of the United States House of Representatives removed by contest